The 1927–28 season was the 28th season of competitive football in Belgium. The Belgian Cup was not played this season and would only resume during the 1934-35 season. The Belgium national football team took part to their 3rd Olympic Games football tournament. They qualified for the quarter-finals, losing to Argentina. Beerschot AC won the Premier Division.

Overview
At the end of the season, SC Anderlechtois and RFC Brugeois were relegated to the Division I, while FC Malinois (Division I winner) and Tilleur FC were promoted to the Premier Division. For the first time test matches have been played to determine the second team to relegate to the Division I as 4 teams finished at the 10th place with the same number of points. The loser of this final round, RFC Brugeois, was relegated to the Division I. The Promotion - the third level in Belgian football - was won by AS Renaisien, Vilvorde FC and Tubantia FAC. The three clubs were replaced by the 12th, 13th and 14th placed teams in the Division I, i.e. respectively Courtrai Sports, Oude God Sport and Fléron FC.

National team

* Belgium score given first

Key
 H = Home match
 A = Away match
 N = On neutral ground
 F = Friendly
 OFR = Olympic Games First Round
 OQF = Olympic Games quarter-finals
 OCS = Olympic Games consolation semi-finals
 o.g. = own goal

Honours

Final league tables

Premier Division

Division I

External links
RSSSF archive - Final tables 1895-2002
Belgian clubs history